Izaline Francisca Juanita Calister (born March 9, 1969) is a Dutch-Curaçaoan singer and songwriter.

Growing up in her native Curaçao for eighteen years, Calister moved to Groningen, the Netherlands, where she studied at the Prince Claus Conservatoire and continues to live.

Calister's music combines the Calypso influences of her native Curaçao with jazz, creating a unique blend of music. These influences and musical features consist of rhythms, dances and songs from the island, of which she adapts and composes to accommodate her own unique style.

Singing in her native language of Papiamentu, Calister feels that of as native speaker of such a unique yet widely unexposed language to the international community, a language also of a very select group of users, it is her duty to be an ambassador of her language.

She performs at venues and festivals around the world.

Awards 
Edison Award (2009)

References

External links 
Izaline Calister.com

Dutch women singers
Living people
Papiamento-language singers
1969 births
Curaçao women
Dutch jazz singers
Calypsonians